A soldier is a person who is a member of an army. A soldier can be a conscripted or volunteer enlisted person, a non-commissioned officer, or an officer.

Etymology
The word is also related to the Medieval Latin , meaning soldier (literally, "one having pay"). These words ultimately derive from the Late Latin word , referring to an Ancient Roman coin used in the Byzantine Empire.

Occupational and other designations

In most armies, the word "soldier" has a general meaning that refers to all members of any army, distinct from more specialized military occupations that require different areas of knowledge and skill sets. "Soldiers" may be referred to by titles, names, nicknames, or acronyms that reflect an individual's military occupation specialty arm, service, or branch of military employment, their type of unit, or operational employment or technical use such as: trooper, tanker (a member of tank crew), commando, dragoon, infantryman, guardsman, artilleryman, paratrooper, grenadier, ranger, sniper, engineer, sapper, craftsman, signaller, medic, or gunner, among other terms. Some of these designations or their etymological origins have existed in the English language for centuries, while others are relatively recent, reflecting changes in technology, increased division of labor, or other factors. In the United States Army, a soldier's military job is designated as a Military Occupational Specialty (MOS), which includes a very wide array of MOS Branches and sub-specialties. One example of a nickname for a soldier in a specific occupation is the term "red caps" to refer to military police personnel in the British Army because of the colour of their headgear.

Infantry are sometimes called "grunts" in the United States Army (as the well as in the U.S. Marine Corps) or "squaddies" (in the British Army). U.S. Army artillery crews, or "gunners," are sometimes referred to as "redlegs", from the service branch colour for artillery. U.S. soldiers are often called "G.I.s" (short for the term "General Issue").  Such terms may be associated with particular wars or historical eras. "G.I." came into common use during World War II and after, but prior to and during World War I especially, American soldiers were called "Doughboys," while British infantry troops were often referred to as "Tommies" (short for the archetypal soldier "Tommy Atkins") and French infantry were called "Poilus" ("hairy ones").  

Some formal or informal designations may reflect the status or changes in status of soldiers for reasons of gender, race, or other social factors. With certain exceptions, service as a soldier, especially in the infantry, had generally been restricted to males throughout world history. By World War II, women were actively deployed in Allied forces in different ways. Some notable female soldiers in the Soviet Union were honored as "Heroes of the Soviet Union" for their actions in the army or as partisan fighters. In the United Kingdom, women served in the Auxiliary Territorial Service (ATS) and later in the Women's Royal Army Corps (WRAC). Soon after its entry into the war, the U.S. formed the Women's Army Corps, whose female soldiers were often referred to as "WACs." These sex-segregated branches were disbanded in the last decades of the twentieth century and women soldiers were integrated into the standing branches of the military, although their ability to serve in armed combat was often restricted.    

Race has historically been an issue restricting the ability of some people to serve in the U.S. Army. Until the Civil War, Black soldiers fought in integrated and sometimes separate units, but at other times were not allowed to serve, largely due to fears about the possible effects of such service on the institution of legal slavery. Some Black soldiers, both freemen and men who had escaped from slavery, served in Union forces, until 1863, when the Emancipation Proclamation opened the door for the formation of Black units. After the war, Black soldiers continued to serve, but in segregated units, often subjected to physical and verbal racist abuse. The term "Buffalo Soldiers" was applied to some units fighting in the 19th century Indian Wars in the American West. Eventually, the phrase was applied more generally to segregated Black units, who often distinguished themselves in armed conflict and other service. In 1948, President Harry S. Truman issued an executive order for the end of segregation in the United States Armed Forces.

Service

Conscription 

Throughout history, individuals have often been compelled by force or law to serve in armies and other armed forces in times of war or other times. Modern forms of such compulsion are generally referred to as "conscription" or a "draft". Currently, many countries require registration for some form of mandatory service, although that requirement may be selectively enforced or exist only in law and not in practice. Usually the requirement applies to younger male citizens, though it may extend to women and non-citizen residents as well. In times of war, the requirements, such as age, may be broadened when additional troops are thought to be needed. 

At different times and places, some individuals have been able to avoid conscription by having another person take their place. Modern draft laws may provide temporary or permanent exemptions from service or allow some other non-combatant service, as in the case of conscientious objectors.

In the United States, males aged 18-25 are required to register with the Selective Service System, which has responsibility for overseeing the draft. However, no draft has occurred since 1973, and the U.S. military has been able to maintain staffing through voluntary enlistment.

Enlistment 
Soldiers in war may have various motivations for voluntarily enlisting and remaining in an army or other armed forces branch. In a study of 18th century soldiers' written records about their time in service, historian Ilya Berkovich suggests "three primary 'levers' of motivation ...  'coercive', 'remunerative', and 'normative' incentives."  Berkovich argues that historians' assumptions that fear of coercive force kept unwilling conscripts in check and controlled rates of desertion have been overstated and that any pay or other remuneration for service as provided then would have been an insufficient incentive. Instead, "old-regime common soldiers should be viewed primarily as willing participants who saw themselves as engaged in a distinct and honourable activity." In modern times, soldiers have volunteered for armed service, especially in time of war, out of a sense of patriotic duty to their homeland or to advance a social, political, or ideological cause, while improved levels of remuneration or training might be more of an incentive in times of economic hardship.  Soldiers might also enlist for personal reasons, such as following family or social expectations, or for the order and discipline provided by military training, as well as for the friendship and connection with their fellow soldiers afforded by close contact in a common enterprise.

In 2018, the RAND Corporation published the results of a study of contemporary American soldiers in Life as a Private: A Study of the Motivations and Experiences of Junior Enlisted Personnel in the U.S. Army. The study found that "soldiers join the Army for family, institutional, and occupational reasons, and many value the opportunity to become a military professional. They value their relationships with other soldiers, enjoy their social lives, and are satisfied with Army life."  However, the authors cautioned that the survey sample consisted of only 81 soldiers and that "the findings of this study cannot be generalized to the U.S. Army as a whole or to any rank."

Length of service 
The length of time that an individual is required to serve as a soldier has varied with country and historical period, whether that individual has been drafted or has voluntarily enlisted. Such service, depending on the army's need for staffing or the individual's fitness and eligibility, may involve fulfillment of a contractual obligation. That obligation might extend for the duration of an armed conflict or may be limited to a set number of years in active duty and/or inactive duty. 

As of 2023, service in the U.S. Army is for a Military Service Obligation of 2 to 6 years of active duty with a remaining term in the Individual Ready Reserve. Individuals may also enlist for part-time duty in the Army Reserve or National Guard. Depending on need or fitness to serve, soldiers usually may reenlist for another term, possibly receiving monetary or other incentives.

In the U.S. Army, career soldiers who have served for at least 20 years are eligible to draw on a retirement pension. The size of the pension as a percentage of the soldier's salary usually increases with the length of time served on active duty.

In media and popular culture 

Since the earliest recorded history, soldiers and warfare have been depicted in countless works, including songs, folk tales, stories, memoirs, biographies, novels and other narrative fiction, drama, films, and more recently television and video, comic books, graphic novels, and games. Often these portrayals have emphasized the heroic qualities of soldiers in war, but at times have emphasized war's inherent dangers, confusions, and trauma and their effect on individual soldiers and others.

See also
 Marine
 Sailor
 Airman
 Mercenary
 Veteran
 Combatant
 Prisoner of war
 Military ranks
 Military compensation
 Women in the military by country

References

External links
 
 Catherine Calloway, "War in Literature and Drama," Oxford Bibliographies: https://www.oxfordbibliographies.com/display/document/obo-9780199791279/obo-9780199791279-0004.xml 

 

 
Military specialisms
Military life
Combat occupations